Belvedere Apartments may refer to:

Belvedere Apartments (Columbia, Missouri)
Belvedere Apartments (Salt Lake City, Utah), listed on the National Register of Historic Places (NRHP) in Salt Lake City